"Southern Girl" is a song written by Jaren Johnston, Rodney Clawson, and Lee Thomas Miller and recorded by American country music artist Tim McGraw. It was released in July 2013 as the fourth single from McGraw's album Two Lanes of Freedom.

Content
The song is about girls from the south and how the narrator finds them attractive.

Critical reception
Billy Dukes of Taste of Country gave the song 4.5 stars out of 5, saying that "[its] overall feel is one that’s repeated each summer, but few have brought it back as effortlessly as McGraw in recent years." Giving it a "B", Joseph Hudak of Country Weekly gave it a "B" grade, and said that "[the song]'d all feel a little trite and disposable if [it] didn't have a monster groove to prop it up." He also said that the song was "utterly singable" and "the ideal summer anthem".

Music video
The accompanying music video for the song was directed by Shane Drake and premiered in July 2013.

Chart performance
"Southern Girl" debuted at number 57 on the US Billboard Country Airplay chart for the week of July 13, 2013. It also debuted at number 44 on Hot Country Songs. It debuted at number 100 on the Billboard Hot 100 on the week of August 10, 2013. It also debuted at number 96 on the Canadian Hot 100 for the week of August 24, 2013. As of January 2014, the song has over sold 526,000 copies in the United States.

Year-end charts

Certifications

References

2013 singles
Tim McGraw songs
Songs written by Rodney Clawson
Songs written by Lee Thomas Miller
Song recordings produced by Byron Gallimore
Song recordings produced by Tim McGraw
Music videos directed by Shane Drake
Big Machine Records singles
2013 songs
Songs written by Jaren Johnston
Songs about the American South